The Mithal al-Alusi List is one of the coalitions of Iraqi political parties that ran in the December 2005 elections. It was formed from the Iraqi Federalist Gathering and the Iraqi Ummah Party  The coalition won 0.3% of the popular vote, thus receiving one seat, which was taken by its name-bearer, Mithal al-Alusi.

Electoral lists for Iraqi elections
Political party alliances in Iraq